Quadrivalent vaccine, designed to protect against four different types of a disease, may refer to:

Quadrivalent influenza vaccine
Quadrivalent HPV vaccine
Quadrivalent meningococcal vaccine